The National Coalition Party (PCN) is a nationalist political party in El Salvador. Until 2011 it was known as the National Conciliation Party (PCN). It was the most powerful political party in the country during the 1960s and 1970s, and was closely associated with the Salvadoran military. Julio Adalberto Rivera Carballo, a candidate of the National Conciliation Party, was elected president in 1962, and the next three presidents were also from the party. After the 1979 coup the party declined in influence but continued to exist.

History

After 2000
Today, it is considered relatively minor as compared with the two major organizations, ARENA and the FMLN.

At the legislative elections, held on 16 March 2003, the party won 13.0% of the popular vote and 16 out of 84 seats in the Legislative Assembly. Its candidate in the presidential election of 21 March 2004, José Rafael Machuca Zelaya, won 2.7%.
In the 12 March 2006 legislative election, the party won 11.0% of the popular vote and 10 out of 84 seats, a major decline in representation, but the party is still the third largest political party in El Salvador. At the January 18, 2009 legislative elections the party won 11 seats.

With no party holding a majority, it can be seen as holding the balance of power. However, it usually sides with the conservative ARENA party.

While the party was technically to be disbanded after the 2004 election, in which its candidate did not gather the necessary 3% of the vote, it was allowed to hold on to its registration by decree; this decree was declared unconstitutional on 30 April 2011, and the party was thus disbanded.

The party was de facto re-established, registering with the Supreme Electoral Tribunal as the National Coalition ('Concertación Nacional', CN) in September 2011. After one year, it added the word 'Partido' ("party") to its full name, which allowed it to again use the traditional acronym PCN. Since 2018, the party has 9 out of 84 congressmen and 25 out of 262 mayorship offices.

PCN Presidents of El Salvador
 Julio Adalberto Rivera (1962–1967)
 Fidel Sánchez Hernández (1967–1972)
 Arturo Armando Molina (1972–1977)
 Carlos Humberto Romero (1977–1979)

Timeline

Electoral history

Presidential elections

Note 
In the 1982 election Álvaro Magaña was elected by the Legislative Assembly

Legislative Assembly elections

References

External links 
 Website of the party

Political parties in El Salvador
Political parties established in 1961
1961 establishments in El Salvador